Travellers Rest is a rural/residential locality in the local government areas (LGA) of Meander Valley (98%) and Northern Midlands (2%) in the Launceston and Central LGA regions of Tasmania. The 2016 census recorded a population of 305 for the state suburb of Travellers Rest.
It is a settled semi-rural area at the edge of Greater Launceston.

History
Travellers Rest is a confirmed locality.
In the 19th century the area was largely uninhabited. At the junction where the road from Launceston branches — the branches lead now and led then to Longford and Hadspen — a hotel was built in 1833 by G & T Burnett. The hotel was initially called the Travellers Rest Hotel. It burned down in March 1930 due to a hotel employee's accident; he was filling a motorcycle with petrol while holding a lit storm lantern. By 1941 only the front wall remained, a state that led to a call for its demolition. The remaining ruins were finally removed in 1990 when the site was covered by construction of the Bass Highway.

Geography
The South Esk River forms the north-western boundary.

Road infrastructure 
National Route 1 (Bass Highway) runs through from east to west.

References

Bibliography

Localities of Meander Valley Council
Towns in Tasmania
Localities of Northern Midlands Council